"Mustaa kahvia" is a Finnish-language song by Finnish singer Jenni Vartiainen, released as the second promotional single from her debut album Ihmisten edessä on March 17, 2008, by Warner Music Finland. The release includes the song, written by Kyösti Salokorpi, its remix and remixes of two other songs, "Toinen" and "Ihmisten edessä".

Track listing

Charts

References

2008 songs
Jenni Vartiainen songs
Finnish-language songs
Warner Music Finland singles